Yaspal is a given name. Notable people with the given name include:

Yashpal (1903–1976), Indian author
Yashpal Arya (born 1952), Indian politician
Yashpal Jain (1912–2000), Indian writer
Yashpal Kapur (1929–1993), Indian politician
Yashpal Mohanty (1978–2017), Indian cricketer
Yashpal Sharma (disambiguation), multiple people, including:
Yashpal Sharma (actor) (born 1965), Indian actor
Yashpal Sharma (cricketer) (1954–2021), Indian cricketer
Yashpal Singh (cricketer) (born 1981), Indian cricketer
Yashpal Singh (politician) (c. 1921 – 2015), Indian politician
Yashpal Singh Kalsi (born 1978), Indian martial artist

See also
Yash Pal